Sergio Bertolucci (born 1 January 1950) is an Italian particle physicist, and a former Director of Research and Scientific Computing at CERN (Conseil Européen pour la Recherche Nucléaire).

Early life
He was born in La Spezia. He studied Particle Physics at the University of Pisa. He did further research at DESY in Germany.

Career

LNF
From 2002-04 he worked at the Laboratori Nazionali di Frascati (LNF), where he was Director.

INFN
From 2005-08 he worked at Istituto Nazionale di Fisica Nucleare (INFN) in Italy.

CERN
He served as CERN Director of Research from 2009 to 2015.

References

External links
 CERN

1950 births
20th-century Italian physicists
People associated with CERN
People from La Spezia
University of Pisa alumni
Living people
21st-century Italian physicists
Fellows of the American Physical Society